Claire Louise Nicholas (born 8 September 1986) is a Welsh cricketer who currently plays for Wales, Western Storm and Welsh Fire. She plays as a right-arm off break bowler. She won two Women's Cricket Super Leagues with Western Storm, in 2017 and 2019.

Early and personal life
Nicholas was born Claire Louise Thomas on 8 September 1986 in Swansea, Wales. She has two children with her partner, Rachel. She also works as a teacher.

Domestic career
Nicholas made her debut for Wales in 2004, against Warwickshire in the County Challenge Cup. The following season, she appeared for Wales in the 2005 Women's European Championship. She was part of the Wales side that gained three consecutive promotions in the County Championship between 2008 and 2010, and took her maiden five-wicket haul in 2013, against Devon. In 2019, she was Wales' leading wicket-taker in the County Championship, with 10 wickets at an average of 17.70. She took seven wickets for the side in the 2022 Women's Twenty20 Cup, including taking 4/20 against Somerset.

Nicholas also played for Western Storm in the Women's Cricket Super League between 2017 and 2019. Nicholas was a key bowler throughout the three seasons, taking 27 wickets at an average of 21.33, with a best of 3/11 against Lancashire Thunder in 2018. Storm won the WCSL twice whilst Nicholas was part of the team, in 2017 and 2019.

In 2020, Nicholas continued to play for Western Storm in the Rachael Heyhoe Flint Trophy. She appeared in three matches, taking two wickets at an average of 44.50. She signed to play for Welsh Fire in The Hundred in 2021, but withdrew as she was due to give birth that summer. She was also not named in the initial Western Storm squad for the 2021 season for the same reason. In August 2021, Nicholas returned to the Western Storm squad, and played her first match of the season in the Charlotte Edwards Cup against North West Thunder. She played four matches overall for the side in 2021, taking 3 wickets in the Rachael Heyhoe Flint Trophy and 2 in the Charlotte Edwards Cup. In 2022, Nicholas was Western Storm's joint-leading wicket-taker in the Charlotte Edwards Cup, with six wickets at an average of 17.50, as well as taking three wickets in the Rachael Heyhoe Flint Trophy. She was also the leading wicket-taker for Welsh Fire in The Hundred, with six wickets at an average of 16.50.

References

External links

1986 births
Living people
Cricketers from Swansea
Welsh women cricketers
Wales women cricketers
Western Storm cricketers
Welsh Fire cricketers